Clarence Robert Janecek (April 1, 1911 – January 16, 1990) was an American football guard who played one season in the National Football League with the Pittsburgh Pirates. He played college football at Purdue University and attended Harrison Technical High School in Chicago, Illinois.

References

External links
 Just Sports Stats
 CLARENCE JANECEK Obituary - Maple Park, Illinois | Legacy

1911 births
1990 deaths
Players of American football from Chicago
American football guards
Purdue Boilermakers football players
Pittsburgh Pirates (football) players